Valérie Jouve (born December 27, 1964 in Saint-Étienne, France) is a contemporary French photographer, video artist, and director.

Biography 
After studying anthropology, Valérie Jouve began pursuing a career as a photographer. Her work refers as much to contemporary art as it does to the fields of anthropology, sociology, and reporting. By photographing "played" or "performed" images, she revels the daily theatrical aspects of contemporary society.

Valérie Jouve has exhibited her photography since 1995, notably at the galerie Anne de Villepoix. In September 2006, she had her first exhibition at the Galerie Xippas in Paris. Her exhibition En attente was presented at the Centre Georges Pompidou in 2010. She had a major survey in 2015 at the Galerie nationale du Jeu de Paume.

As a film director, she made her first movie, Grand Littoral, in 2003, which won the Prix Georges de Beauregard National at the Marseille Festival of Documentary Film. In 2006, she directed Time is Working around Rotterdam.

She received the prix Niépce in 2013. She was named a knight of the Ordre des Arts et des Lettres in 2011.

Bibliography 
 
 Valérie Jouve, exhibition, March 4-April 20, 1998, Centre national de la photographie; catalogue, ed. Michel Poivert, Centre national de la photographie, Arles, Actes Sud, 1998. 
 Valérie Jouve, exhibition, June 23-September 13, 2010, Centre Pompidou; catalogue, ed. Quentin Bajac, éditions du Centre Pompidou, Paris, 2010, 96 p.
 Valérie Jouve, Résonances, Göttingen, Steidl, 2010, 240 p.
 Ceci n'est pas un parc, éditions Libel, Lyon, 2010.
 Valérie Jouve, by Dean Inkster; Paris, Hazan, 2002.
 Valérie Jouve: Corps en résistance, exhibition, June 2-September 27, 2015, Jeu de Paume; November 5, 2015 – January 17, 2016, La Corogne, la Fundación Luis Seoane; catalogue, ed. Marta Gili and Pia Viewing, Jeu de Paume, Paris, 2015.
 "The spaces of containment: Valérie Jouve's urban portraits," by Olga Smith, Nottingham French Studies, 2014, .

References

External links 
 http://www.valeriejouve.com/
 https://www.centrepompidou.fr/cpv/resource/cAbM8Mq/rXKEak
 http://www.jeudepaume.org/index.php?page=article&idArt=2239
 Olga Smith, 'The spaces of containment: Valérie Jouve's urban portraits', Nottingham French Studies, (2014): 155-168

1964 births
Living people
French photographers
French video artists
French documentary film directors
French women photographers
Women documentary filmmakers
20th-century French women
French contemporary artists